Lamento (English: "Lament") is a song by Peruvian singer-songwriter Gian Marco released by Sony Music Latin and Crescent Moon Records in 2003 as the third single of his sixth studio album A Tiempo.

Background and release
The song is a slow pop ballad which is defined as a song to help you forget about your ex and get over a heartbreak. Since its release it has become a major hit in Gian Marco's career and it's considered one of his signature songs.

Commercial Performance
The song was a success throughout Latin America and parts of Europe. The song peaked at #38 on the Billboard Hot Latin Tracks chart becoming his highest performing song on that chart to date. It became a good follow up success to the album's first two singles Se Me Olvidó and Te Mentiría. The song also reached number 38 on the Los Principales radio airplay chart in Spain on May 3, 2003.

Live Performances
Gian Marco has performed the song on every single one of his tours and in his 2012 concert to celebrate his 20 year music career he performed the song alongside special guest Manuel Mijares.

Music Video
The music video for the song shows Gian Marco walking through the streets singing  the song while carrying his guitar and occasionally playing it.

Charts

References

Gian Marco songs
2003 singles
Spanish-language songs
2003 songs
Pop ballads
Songs written by Gian Marco
Song recordings produced by Emilio Estefan